Franco Rossi (2 January 1916, Milan – 3 February 2006, Alassio) was an Italian ice hockey player and sports manager.

He played for HC Milano from 1937 until 1950, winning six Serie A league championships. He participated in 48 games for the Italy men's national ice hockey team, playing three world championships as well as the Winter Olympic Games of 1936 and 1948. Rossi later became president of HC Bocconi and HC Ambrosiana.

References

Scomparso Franco Rossi, Hockey Time 

1916 births
2006 deaths
Ice hockey players at the 1936 Winter Olympics
Ice hockey players at the 1948 Winter Olympics
Olympic ice hockey players of Italy